Adam Clay Miller is an American attorney and politician serving as a member of the Ohio House of Representatives from the 6th district. He is a Democrat. The district consists of portions of Columbus including Hilltop, and the Southside as well as Valleyview in Franklin County.

Early life and education
Miller was born in Columbus, Ohio and is the fourth-generation resident of the Hilltop neighborhood. He earned a Bachelor of Arts degree in English literature from Ohio State University, a Juris Doctor from the Capital University Law School, and a Master of Science in strategic studies from the United States Army War College.

Career 
Outside of politics, Miller works as a director with Kegler, Brown, Hill + Ritter. In 1998, Miller ran unsuccessfully for the United States House of Representatives against Deborah Pryce. He lost again in 2004, this time for a seat on the Ohio State Board of Education.

A colonel in the United States Army Reserve, Miller is a Judge Advocate General's Corps officer. He did a tour of Afghanistan in 2004 and another in 2020. Formerly, Miller served on the Grandview Heights City School Board.

Ohio House of Representatives
In 2016, Representative Michael Curtin decided not to seek a third term. Opting to seek the Democratic nomination, Miller defeated Matt Jolson 58% to 42%. This was despite Miller not being endorsed by the Franklin County Democratic Party.

In a safely Democratic seat, Miller won the general election against Republican John Rush by only a 54% to 46% margin, much closer than anticipated. Miller is only the second person to hold this seat, after Curtin, since it was established in 2013.

Personal life 
He is married with two children and resides in Marble Cliff.

References

External links
Ohio State Representative Adam Miller official site

Living people
Capital University alumni
Democratic Party members of the Ohio House of Representatives
21st-century American politicians
Politicians from Columbus, Ohio
Year of birth missing (living people)